Events from the year 1961 in South Korea.

Incumbents
President: Yun Posun 
Prime Minister: Chang Myon (until 18 May)

Events

16 May - May 16 Coup

Births

 27 April - Sung Dong-il, actor
 20 September - Na Young-hee, actress
 1 December - Kim Jin-ho, archer

See also
List of South Korean films of 1961
Years in Japan
Years in North Korea

References

 
South Korea
Years of the 20th century in South Korea
1960s in South Korea
South Korea